Saskia Marka (née Rüter; born 1975) is a German film title designer, known for her work on the TV series Babylon Berlin, The Queen's Gambit, Deutschland 83, Deutschland 86 and Deutschland 89.

Life and work
Marka studied communication design at the Muthesius University of Fine Arts and Design (Muthesius Kunsthochschule) in Kiel. After receiving her diploma there, she went on to study Film & TV Design (today: Motion Design) at the Film Academy Baden-Württemberg in Ludwigsburg in 2000, which Marka also completed with a diploma in 2003.

Since then she has been working as a freelancer and has designed title sequences, opening and closing credits for many German and international films and television series. Marka also designed the artwork for several German feature films and series. In 2010, she became the first German title designer to receive the Certificate Of Typographic Excellence from the Type Directors Club of New York for her title design for the German feature film This Is Love.

Marka achieved international fame with her work for the television series Babylon Berlin (2017), The Queen's Gambit (2020), Deutschland 83 (2015), Deutschland 86 (2018) and Deutschland 89 (2020). Her opening credits for the TV series Deutschland 83 were among "The 10 Best Opening Credits of 2015" of the website Vulture.com. The title sequence for the TV series Babylon Berlin, created by Marka, "was named Art of the Title’s number one title sequence of 2018". In 2019 she was nominated for the SXSW Film Design Award (the jury prize for Excellence in Title Design) at the SXSW Film Festival for her title design of the series Babylon Berlin. In 2021, Marka won the SXSW Film Design Award and received a Bronze Cube at the 100th Annual ADC Awards for her end title sequence for the series The Queen's Gambit. This sequence made it also into the "Top Picks of 2020" by industry website Art of the Title. In the same year, she also received an Emmy nomination for her work on The Queen's Gambit.

Filmography (selection)

film title sequences

Unschuldig (TV series), (2008) - director: Philipp Kadelbach
This Night (Diese Nacht) (feature film), (2008) - director: Werner Schroeter
I Know You Know (feature film), (2008) - director: Justin Kerrigan
Horst Schlämmer - Isch kandidiere! (feature film), (2009) - director: Angelo Colagrossi
Gravity (Schwerkraft) (feature film), (2009) - director: Maximilian Erlenwein
This Is Love (feature film), (2009) - director: Matthias Glasner
Großstadtrevier (TV series), (2007 - 2009) - director: Various
Outcast (feature film), (2010) - director: Colm McCarthy
 (Das Leben ist zu lang) (feature film), (2010) - director: Dani Levy
The Good Neighbour (Unter Nachbarn) (feature film), (2011) - director: Stephan Rick
Blaubeerblau (TV movie), (2011) - director: Rainer Kaufmann
The Loneliest Planet (feature film), (2011) - director: Julia Loktev
Mercy (Gnade) (feature film), (2012) - director: Matthias Glasner
The Iran Job (documentary), (2012) - director: Till Schauder
Invasion (feature film), (2012) - director: Dito Tsintsadze
The Weekend (Das Wochenende) (feature film), (2012) - director: Nina Grosse
Wolf Children (Wolfskinder) (feature film), (2013) - director: Rick Ostermann
Lose My Self (Vergiss mein Ich) (feature film), (2014) - director: Jan Schomburg
Phoenix (feature film), (2014) - director: Christian Petzold
Sanctuary (Freistatt) (feature film), (2015) - director: Marc Brummund
Deutschland 83 (TV mini-series), (2015) - director: Edward Berger, Samira Radsi
Stefan Zweig: Farewell to Europe (Vor der Morgenröte) (feature film), (2016) - director: Maria Schrader
Deutschland 86 (TV mini-series), (2018) - director: Florian Cossen, Arne Feldhusen
Tatort (TV series, title designer for 6 episodes), (2015 - 2018) - director: Sebastian Marka
Die verlorene Tochter (TV mini-series), (2020) - director: Kai Wessel
Deutschland 89 (TV mini-series), (2020) - director: Soleen Yusef, Randa Chahoud
The Queen's Gambit (TV mini-series), (2020) - director: Scott Frank
Leipzig Homicide (SOKO Leipzig) (TV series), (2017 - 2021) - director: VariousBabylon Berlin (TV series), (2017 - 2022) - director: Henk Handloegten, Tom Tykwer, Achim von BorriesLeopard Skin, (2022) - director: Sebastian Gutierrez
Liaison, (2023) - director: Stephen Hopkins

Awards
Type Directors Club
2010: Certificate Of Typographic Excellence for This Is LoveBeazley Designs of the Year
2020: Nomination for the Beazley Design of the Year Award in the category Graphics for Babylon BerlinSouth by Southwest (SXSW)
2019: Nomination for the SXSW Film Design Award - Excellence in Title Design in the category Title Design Competition for Babylon Berlin2021: SXSW Film Design Award - Excellence in Title Design in the category Title Design Competition for The Queen's GambitADC Awards
2021: Bronze Cube Award in the category Motion / Film / Title Sequences for The Queen's GambitPrimetime Emmy Awards
2021: Nomination for the Primetime Emmy Award for Outstanding Main Title Design at the 73rd Primetime Emmy Awards for The Queen's Gambit''

References

External links

Official website
Saskia Marka at Art of the Title

1975 births
Film and television title designers
People from Bayreuth
German designers
Living people
Film people from Bavaria